Kusimovskogo Rudnika (Küsem rudnigı) is a rural locality (a selo) in Tashbulatovsky Selsoviet, Abzelilovsky District, Bashkortostan, Russia. The population was 342 as of 2010. There are 9 streets.

Geography 
Kusimovskogo Rudnika is located 45 km north of Askarovo (the district's administrative centre) by road. Geologorazvedka and Zelyonaya Polyana are the nearest rural localities.

References 

Rural localities in Abzelilovsky District